Buhoci is a commune in Bacău County, Western Moldavia, Romania. It is composed of five villages: Bijghir, Buhocel, Buhoci, Coteni and Dospinești.

Natives
 Ioan Borcea

References

Communes in Bacău County
Localities in Western Moldavia